Rosana is a given name. 

Notable people with the name include:

 Rosana Arbelo (born 1963), Spanish singer and composer
 Rosana Bertone (born 1972), Argentine politician
 Rosana Castrillo Diaz (born 1971), Spanish artist
 Rosana Chouteau, Native American clan leader
 Rosana Favila (born 1964), Brazilian rhythmic gymnast
 Rosana Franco (born 1970), Mexican sportscaster
 Rosana Gómez (born 1980), Argentine footballer
 Rosana Hermann (born 1957), Brazilian writer and television host
 Rosana Kiroska (born 1991), Macedonian skier
 Rosana Pastor (born 1960), Spanish politician and actor
 Rosana Paulino (born 1967), Brazilian visual artist, educator and curator
 Rosana dos Santos Augusto (born 1982), Brazilian footballer
 Rosana Serrano (born 1998), Cuban rower
 Rosana Simón (born 1989), Spanish taekwondo practitioner
 Rosana Tositrakul (born 1957), Thai politician
 Rosana Ubanell (born 1958), Spanish novelist

Given names derived from plants or flowers